Fantasy Air (Fantasy Air, s.r.o.) was a Czech aircraft manufacturer.  The company started building ultralight aircraft in the 1990s. Fantasy Air manufactured the Allegro 2007 aircraft under microlight/ultralight regulations in several countries and under the Light-sport aircraft (LSA) rules in the US.

The company made a deal to purchase Pisek Airport in 2007, which took needed cash out of the manufacturing  operation. The company was declared bankrupt on 9 November 2007, but managed to sell the airport and make a recovery.

In July 2009 the manufacturing of the Allegro was moved to Roseburg, Oregon, USA, as part of X-Air Australia. The move was attributed to the high value of the Euro reducing sales to the USA and Australia.

References

External links

 Internet Archive of company website

Defunct aircraft manufacturers of the Czech Republic and Czechoslovakia